Sleep Sweet, My Darling is a Croatian comedy film directed by Neven Hitrec. It was released in 2005 and was entered into the 28th Moscow International Film Festival.

Cast
 Ljubomir Kerekeš - Darko Skrinjar
 Ivan Glowatzky - Tomica
 Ines Bojanić - Tonka
 Ozren Grabarić - Professor Laslo
 Alan Malnar - Tomica
 Franka Kos - Janja Bartolic
 Vlatko Dulić - Djed
 Višnja Babić - Mira Skrinjar
 Ksenija Marinković - Teta Nadica
 Marija Kohn - Neda Glazar
 Danko Ljuština - Djed Ladovic

References

External links
 

2005 films
2000s Croatian-language films
2005 comedy films
Croatian comedy films